Esther Lahoz Castelló (born 2 May 1963 in Pancrudo) is a retired Spanish sprinter who specialised in the 400 metres. She represented her country in the 4 × 400 metres relay at the 1992 Summer Olympics, as well as three consecutive World Championships, starting in 1991.

Competition record

Personal bests
Outdoor
 100 metres – 11.96 (+1.9 m/s) (Gavá 1998)
 200 metres – 23.82 (+1.8 m/s) (Madrid 1991)
 400 metres – 52.67 (Bari 1997)
 400 metres hurdles – 57.40 (Lisbon 1998)

Indoor
 60 metres – 7.74 (San Sebastián 1997)
 200 metres – 25.15 (San Sebastián 1997)
 400 metres – 53.39 (Valencia 1988)

References

 All-Athletics profile

1963 births
Living people
People from Teruel Community
Sportspeople from the Province of Teruel
Spanish female sprinters
Olympic athletes of Spain
Athletes (track and field) at the 1992 Summer Olympics
World Athletics Championships athletes for Spain
Mediterranean Games bronze medalists for Spain
Mediterranean Games medalists in athletics
Athletes (track and field) at the 1991 Mediterranean Games
Athletes (track and field) at the 1997 Mediterranean Games
Olympic female sprinters